Independent School District 200 (ISD 200), or Hastings Public Schools, is a school district headquartered in Hastings, Minnesota.

Schools
Secondary schools:
Hastings High School
Hastings Middle School
Elementary schools:
Kennedy Elementary
McAuliffe Elementary
Pinecrest Elementary
Alternative schools
Hastings ALC

References

External links
 
School districts in Minnesota
Education in Dakota County, Minnesota